Xaniopyramis is an extinct genus of xiphosuran, related to the modern horseshoe crab. It lived in the early Carboniferous.

Species
 X. linseyi Siveter and Selden, 1987

Sources

Invertebrate Palaeontology & Evolution by Euan Neilson Kerr Clarkson

External links
Xiphosura at Palaeos.com

Xiphosura
Mississippian arthropods
Prehistoric chelicerate genera